Pietro Rizzuto (March 18, 1934 – August 3, 1997) (was a Canadian politician.

Born in Cattolica Eraclea, Italy, he came to Canada at the age of 20. In 1963, he founded Inter State Paving Inc., a construction company.

In 1976, he was appointed to the Senate of Canada by Pierre Trudeau representing the senatorial division of Repentigny, Quebec. He was the first Canadian of Italian origin to be appointed to the Senate. He was an "old and dear friend" of Jean Chrétien.

He was made a Grande Ufficiale of Italy's Order of Merit of the Republic.

He was married to Pina and had three children: Melina, Alfonso, and Maria Christina. He died in Montreal in 1997.

References

External links
 
 

1934 births
1997 deaths
Canadian senators from Quebec
Italian emigrants to Canada
Liberal Party of Canada senators
Burials at Notre Dame des Neiges Cemetery